Sabadabadu is a 1981 Portuguese comedy television series. It lasted for one season and was produced by Radiotelevisão Portuguesa (RTP) . Each episode lasted 60 minutes.

Sabadabadu starred actors such as Camilo de Oliveira, Ivone Silva, Victor De Sousa, Manuela Queiroz and Carlos Quintas.

External links
 
 Page on TV1 website

Portuguese comedy television series
1981 Portuguese television series debuts
1981 Portuguese television series endings
Portuguese-language television shows
1980s Portuguese television series